The Pinner reaction refers to the acid catalysed reaction of a nitrile with an alcohol to form an imino ester salt (alkyl imidate salt); this is sometimes referred to as a Pinner salt.
The reaction is named after Adolf Pinner, who first described it in 1877.
Pinner salts are themselves reactive and undergo additional nucleophilic additions to give various useful products:
 With an excess of alcohol to form an orthoester 
 With ammonia or an amine to form an amidine (di-nitriles may form imidines, for instance succinimidine from succinonitrile)
 With water to form an ester
 With hydrogen sulfide to form a thionoester

Commonly, the Pinner salt itself is not isolated, with the reaction being continued to give the desired functional group (orthoester etc.) in one go. It should be appreciated that the Pinner reaction refers specifically to an acid catalyzed process, but that similar results can often be achieved using base catalysis. The two approaches can be complementary, with nitriles which are unreactive under acid conditions often giving better results in the presence of base, and vice versa. The determining factor is typically how electron-rich or poor the nitrile is. For example: an electron-poor nitrile is a good electrophile (readily susceptible to attack from alkoxides etc.) but a poor nucleophile would typically be easier to protonate than to participate in the reaction and hence would be expected to react more readily under basic rather than acidic conditions.

See also
 Hoesch reaction
 Overman rearrangement
 Stephen aldehyde synthesis – essentially the same reaction but including a reduction and with water as the nucleophile; generates the aldehyde.

References

Addition reactions
Name reactions